The Championship of Australia was an Australian rules football tournament which was contested between football clubs from the Victorian, South Australian, Western Australian and Tasmanian football leagues. The Championship took place three times in the 19th century and then from 1907 to 1914—with the exception of 1912—and every year from 1968 to 1975. All but two of the Championships were played in Adelaide, and all of them occurred after the respective league seasons had ended. The 1975 Championship of Australia was the last edition of the competition, with the 1976 NFL Championship replacing the format, albeit for only one year with VFL clubs.

History
The first group of Club Championships were between the Victorian Football Association and South Australian Football Association premiers while from 1907 until 1914, the final competition for 54 years, it was contested between the premiers of the VFL and SAFL. Port Adelaide were champions a record four times during this period. The inaugural Championship was a best of three game series but all future tournaments were decided by a Grand Final.

In 1968 the Championship returned under the same format but the Australian National Football Council refused to grant it official status as a team from Western Australia and Tasmania were not competing and it thus couldn't be referred to as a Championship of 'Australia'. Both state's premiers joined the tournament from 1972 onwards to make it a four club championship. For Tasmania, it was the premier of the Tasmanian State Premiership that was invited to the Championship – except in 1974, when no state premiership was held and a composite team of players from the premier clubs of the various Tasmanian leagues took part. VFL clubs won every Championship from 1968, except in 1972 when South Australia's North Adelaide Football Club upset Victoria's Carlton Football Club to win by a point.

In 1976, the National Football League abandoned the post-season Championship of Australia concept by establishing the NFL Night Series. It was contested on weekday nights concurrently with the 1976 premiership season by twelve clubs – five from the VFL, four from the SANFL and three from the WAFL – who qualified based on their 1975 positions. It is sometimes seen as a natural extension of the Championship of Australia.

Champions by year (1888–1914, 1968–75)

* Prior to 1897, behinds, although recorded, were not added to a team's score, as whoever kicked more goals won the game.
^ 1896 championship was played in June 1897 owing to the unavailability of the Adelaide Oval in the year prior.

Most Championships

References

 
Australian rules interstate football
History of Australian rules football
Australian rules football competitions in Australia